The Rhinelander Daily News is a newspaper based in Rhinelander, Wisconsin. The newspaper is published mornings, six days per week, from Sunday to Friday. It is owned by Northwoods Media LLC. The Daily News is primarily distributed in the Oneida County area. It published a monthly business-to-business publication called Business Watch, and Best Years, a monthly publication for mature readers.

History
The newspaper can trace its origin to 1882. That year a newspaper called The New North began publication in Rhinelander. In 1890, an Eagle River, Wisconsin newspaper called The Vindicator was formed; it later became The Rhinelander News in 1910. During World War I, the publishers of The News decided they wanted daily coverage of the war, so they began publishing daily in 1917. The News purchased The New North in 1947.

The paper was formerly owned by Scripps League Newspapers, which was acquired by Pulitzer in 1996; Lee Enterprises acquired Pulitzer in 2005. In 2006, Lee sold the Daily News to local ownership.

References

External links
The Rhinelander Daily News Official website

Newspapers published in Wisconsin
Oneida County, Wisconsin
Publications established in 1882
Rhinelander, Wisconsin